Scott Moore is the name of:

Scott Moore (baseball) (born 1983), American baseball player
Scott Moore (rugby league) (born 1988), English rugby league footballer
Scott Moore (screenwriter), American screenwriter
Scott Moore (sergeant), American Marine who made an online request for actress Mila Kunis to accompany him to the United States Marine Corps Ball
Scott Moore (television executive), Canadian television executive
Scott P. Moore, retired Rear Admiral of the U.S. Navy and an Admiral Circle member for SEAL: The Unspoken Sacrifice
Scotty Moore (1931–2016), guitarist best known for his work with Elvis Presley's early career
Scott Moore, trans man best known for being one of the first trans men who gave birth; see male pregnancy